Tun Abdul Razak Stadium (Malay: Stadium Tun Abdul Razak / STAR) is a football stadium in Jengka, Maran District, Pahang, Malaysia.  It is currently used primarily for football matches.  The stadium holds 25,000 people and opened in 2015. It was named after former prime minister of Malaysia, Tun Abdul Razak and currently is the home stadium of Felda United.

The stadium was used for the first time in final match of Piala Pengerusi Felda 2015, between Felda Wilayah Jengka and Felda Wilayah Gua Musang.

Attendances

The average and highest attendances at Felda United domestic league competitions:

See also

 List of stadiums in Malaysia

References

Football venues in Malaysia
Maran District
Sports venues in Pahang
Sports venues completed in 2015
Felda United F.C.